KSDR-FM (92.9 FM, New Country KS93) is a country music formatted radio station broadcasting to the Watertown, South Dakota area. The station is owned and operated by Alpha Media after it purchased the stations of Digity, LLC.

References

External links
Watertown Radio
 

SDR-FM
Country radio stations in the United States
Radio stations established in 1992
1992 establishments in South Dakota